Guillermo Mc Cormick (1938–2005) was an Argentine rugby union player. His position on the field was prop. Mc Cormick's entire career was in Belgrano Athletic Club, having also played for the Argentina national team. In 1965, was part in the historic tour by Rhodesia and South Africa.

Career 

In 1959, Mc Cormick began his career playing for the club Belgrano, where he won four titles. He also was member of the executive committee of Belgrano club, and was his youth coach.

He had his first test match in the 1964 South American Rugby Championship, tournament played in São Paulo. On August 19, 1964, Mc Cormick debuted on the national team, scoring a try against Brazil, in the Argentina's victory by 30–5.

In 1965, Guillermo Mc Cormick participated in the successful tour by South Africa. On this tour the national team began using the name Los Pumas.

Titles

International titles

References

External links 
www.espn.com.ar

1938 births
2005 deaths
Argentine people of Irish descent
Argentine people of Scottish descent
Rugby union players from Buenos Aires
Argentina international rugby union players
Argentine rugby union players
Rugby union props